The Christian Vegetarian Association (CVA) is an international, non-denominational Christian vegetarian organization that promotes responsible stewardship of God's creation through plant-based eating. The CVA advocates vegetarianism from a biblically-based, Christian perspective and sees dietary choice as a valid way to bear witness to Christ's ministry of love, peace, mercy and compassion, and prepare for the Peaceable Kingdom as foretold in the Bible.

Overview
The CVA encourages Christians to reduce or eliminate animal products as part of their Christian calling to be good stewards of God's Creation. According to their website, the CVA is "an international, non-denominational ministry of believers dedicated to respectfully promoting healthy, Christ-centered and God-honoring living among Christians."

The CVA promotes the ethical, environmental and health benefits of plant-based diets. They assert that there is a connection between animal-based diets and world hunger, ecological damage, animal mistreatment and human disease.

The CVA's stated mission is:
To support and encourage Christian vegetarians around the world.
To share with non-vegetarian Christians how a vegetarian diet can be a powerful and faith-strengthening witness to Christ's love, compassion, and peace.
To show the world that plant-based diets represent good, responsible Christian stewardship for all God's Creation.

According to Samantha Jane Calvert, organizations such as the CVA serve to address animal welfare and vegetarian concerns among Christians who find that "mainstream Christian Churches have little to say on the subject of vegetarianism." As of 2012, the CVA had approximately 6,000 members. The CVA's growth is a manifestation of increasing concern for animal well-being among Christians.

History
The Christian Vegetarian Association (CVA) was founded in 1999 by Nathan Braun and Stephen H. Webb, Professor of Religion at Wabash College.

Braun organized a board of respected professors, theologians, and activists representing a broad range of backgrounds and perspectives. Evidently resonating with many Christians who see their vegetarian diets as reflections of their faith, the organization quickly grew.

In 2000, the CVA produced its first edition of What Would Jesus Eat…Today? which has an annual distribution rate of approximately 250,000 and been translated into several languages.

In 2002, CVA founder Nathan Braun and co-chairman Stephen R. Kaufman, M.D. published the first edition of Good News for All Creation: Vegetarianism as Christian Stewardship (2002: Vegetarian Advocates Press) and a revised, second version two years later (2004: Vegetarian Advocates Press).

In 2006, the CVA produced a short documentary film with an accompanying study guide called Honoring God's Creation.

See also

 Animal rights
 Christian pacifism
 Christian vegetarianism
 List of vegetarian organizations
 Bruce Friedrich
 PETA
 Andrew Linzey
 Tom Regan
 Peter Singer

References

External links
 

Christian advocacy groups
Christian vegetarianism
Vegetarian organizations
Organizations established in 1999
1999 establishments in the United States